National Highway 931, commonly referred to as NH 931 is a national highway in  India. It is a spur road of National Highway 31. NH-931 traverses the state of Uttar Pradesh in India.

Route 
Pratapgarh, Amethi, Gauriganj, Musafirkhana, Jagdishpur.

Junctions  

  Terminal near Pratapgarh.
  near Gauriganj.
  Terminal near Jagdishpur.

See also 

 List of National Highways in India
 List of National Highways in India by state

References

External links 
 NH 931 on OpenStreetMap

National highways in India
National Highways in Uttar Pradesh